Kingdom of Crooked Mirrors (translit. Korolevstvo krivykh zerkal) is a 1963 Soviet fairy tale film directed by Aleksandr Rou based on the novel, Kingdom of Crooked Mirrors, by Vitali Gubarev.

At the end of 2007, Russia TV filmed a musical remake with the same name, featuring stars Nikolay Baskov, Alla Pugacheva, and the Tolmachevy Sisters.  The original film contains introduction music and a fairytale style of the early 1960s. It is also notable for its use of actual twins in the leading roles.

The film was also the inspiration for a restaurant in Moscow which only hired twins as waiting staff.

Plot summary 
Similar in subject to and perhaps inspired by the novel Through The Looking Glass, the film centers around an encounter between a girl named Olya and a mysterious counterpart, Yalo, while staring into a mirror. The characters are exact opposites: Yalo is the absolute opposite of Olya in every way. Where Yalo is organized and precise, Olya is careless and absent-minded. In the story, Olya steps through the mirror into the Kingdom of Crooked Mirrors where Yalo resides.  The kingdom, under the rule of King Yagupop LXXVII (reverse of Popugay, meaning parrot), produces crooked mirrors that brainwash its people through subtle changes in reality.  When Yalo's friend, a boy named Gurd (reverse of Drug, meaning friend), is suddenly imprisoned for refusing to make crooked mirrors by the evil leaders Anidag (reverse of Gadina, meaning snake), Nushrok (reverse of Korshun, meaning kite) and Abazh (reverse of Zhaba, meaning toad), Olya decides to accompany Yalo to rescue him.

They meet a character who introduces herself as Aunt Aksal (reverse of Laska, meaning kindness), one of the king's cooks, who in order to help them reach the king and save Gurd, disguises them as pages of the king. On meeting the king, Anidag, Nushrok, and Abazh reveal themselves to be the actual powers behind the throne. The latter half of the story focuses on their ultimate defeat and the rescue of Gurd with the help of Anidag's humiliated old servant Bar (reverse of Rab, meaning slave), who rebels against his master. The kingdom's mirrors are returned to normal, and its society becomes free. Olya at last returns to her home and lives happily ever after with her grandmother.

It has been suggested the story is directed at the perceived hypocrisy of western nations in attacking the Soviet propaganda machine during the Cold War.

Cast 
 Olga Yukina as Olya
 Tatyana Yukina as Yalo
 Tatyana Barysheva as Grandmother
 Anatoly Kubatsky as Jagupop 77
 Andrei Fajt as Nushrok
 Lidiya Vertinskaya as Anidag
 Arkadi Tsinman as Abag
 Andrei Stapran as Gurd
 Ivan Kuznetsov as Bar
 Georgi Millyar as Grand Master of ceremonies
 Pavel Pavlenko as Master of ceremonies
 Tamara Nosova as Aunt Aksal
 Vera Altayskaya as Asirk 
 Alexander Khvylya as  the royal chef
 Valentin Bryleyev as tambourmajor

References

External links 

1964 films
1960s children's fantasy films
Soviet fantasy films
1960s Russian-language films
Gorky Film Studio films
Russian children's fantasy films
Films directed by Aleksandr Rou
Films based on fairy tales
Soviet children's films